The Men of Sherwood Forest is a 1954 British adventure film directed by Val Guest and starring Don Taylor, Reginald Beckwith, Eileen Moore and David King-Wood. The film follows the exploits of Robin Hood and his followers.  Doreen Carwithen wrote the score for the film. Produced by Hammer Films it was shot at the company's Bray Studios with sets designed by the art director J. Elder Wills. Exteriors were shot at Bodiam Castle in Sussex.

Plot
In 1194, on his return from the Third Crusade, Richard the Lionheart is taken prisoner in Germany. Disguised as a troubadour, Robin Hood builds a plan to rescue him from this tight spot but is captured. The Merry Men then have to fulfil a double mission: find Robin Hood and save the King.

Cast

 Don Taylor as Robin Hood
 Reginald Beckwith as Friar Tuck
 Eileen Moore as Lady Alys
 David King-Wood as Sir Guy Belton
 Douglas Wilmer as Sir Nigel Saltire
 Harold Lang as Hubert
 Ballard Berkeley as Walter
 Patrick Holt as King Richard
 Wensley Pithey as Hugo
 Leslie Linder as Little John
 John Van Eyssen as Will Scarlett
 Leonard Sachs as Sheriff of Nottingham
 Raymond Rollett as 	Abbot St. Jude
 Toke Townley as Father David
 Vera Pearce as Elvira
 John Kerr as Brian of Eskdale
 John Stuart as Moraine
 Bernard Bresslaw as Garth
 Edward Hardwicke as Outlaw
 Jack May as Villager

Crew
 Director: Val Guest
 Assistant director: Jack Sangster 
 Screenplay by Allan MacKinnon
 Photography: Walter J. Harvey, B.S.C
 Music by Doreen Carwithen
 Musical director: John Hollingsworth
 Art director: J. Elder Wills
 Editor: James Needs
 Production manager: Jimmy Sangster
 Produced by Michael Carreras
 Sound recording: Sid Wiles and Ken Cameron
 Continuity: Renee Glynne
 Camera operator: Len Harris
 Make-up: Phillip Leakey
 Hairdresser: Monica Hustler
 Costume designer: Michael Withaker
 Wardrobe mistress: Molly Arbuthnot
 Production company: Hammer Film Productions
 Country: England
 Aspect ratio: 1.37:1 - Eastmancolor - Mono (RCA Sound Recording)
 Runtime: 77 mn
 Release date: 17 November 1954
 Produced at Bray Studio, England

Critical reception
David Parkinson noted in the Radio Times "a cheap and cheerful Hammer outing to Sherwood, with production values on a par with the infamously parsimonious ITV series starring Richard Greene", concluding "Val Guest directs with little feel for the boisterous action, but it's a tolerable frolic all the same", while TV Guide wrote that "this low-budget swashbuckler is good fun for the undiscriminating".

References

External links
 

1954 films
British adventure films
1954 adventure films
1950s English-language films
Robin Hood films
Films directed by Val Guest
Films shot at Bray Studios
Hammer Film Productions films
Cultural depictions of Richard I of England
1950s British films